Parkers Marsh Natural Area Preserve is a  Natural Area Preserve located in Accomack County, Virginia.  The preserve incorporates beach habitat along the Chesapeake Bay as well as low marsh, high marsh, shrubland, and forest vegetation; the wetlands provide a home for many different species of animals and plants.  About 75% of the site is saltmarsh.  Marsh elder and black cherry may be found on old dune ridges on the site, as may loblolly pine.  Some lower dunes support various grassland species.  Peregrine falcons have nested in the area since 1998, and the rare saltmarsh sparrow has been observed nesting at the site.  In addition, the beach provides a home for the northeastern beach tiger beetle, listed as threatened in the United States.

The preserve has been designated an Important Bird Area (IBA) by the National Audubon Society as a part of the "Delmarva Bayside Marshes IBA", which also includes the nearby Mark's and Jack's Island Natural Area Preserve and Saxis Wildlife Management Area.

Parkers Marsh Natural Area Preserve is owned and maintained by the Virginia Department of Conservation and Recreation. It is open to public access, however it is accessible only by boat and does not include improvements such as docks. Visitors are encouraged to contact a state-employed land steward prior to visiting.

See also
 List of Virginia Natural Area Preserves

References

External links
Virginia Department of Conservation and Recreation: Parkers Marsh Natural Area Preserve

Virginia Natural Area Preserves
Protected areas of Accomack County, Virginia
Landforms of Accomack County, Virginia
Marshes of Virginia
Important Bird Areas of Virginia